William Gale (18231909) was a British painter of the pre-Raphaelite school.

Life and career

Gale was born in London. He exhibited annually at the Royal Academy 184493, but was never elected a member. He exhibited regularly at the British Institution and at the Royal Society of British Artists.

In 1851, he married and travelled to Italy for his honeymoon. Like many of his contemporary artists, he travelled the Middle East in 1862 and again 1867. He was a prolific artist; his output included sentimental, biblical and mythological subjects, and portraits and Orientalist pictures. There are examples of his work in the Tate Gallery, in the Glasgow Museums Resource Centre, and in the Art Gallery of New South Wales.

His painting Christ's Entry into Jerusalem features in the sleeve notes of the 2011 album 90 Bisodol (Crimond) by the band Half Man Half Biscuit.

Selected works
 
 Young Celadon and his Amelia, 1845
 Chaucer's Dream, 1850
 Cydippe, 1851
 The Captured Runaway, 1856 (John Scott Collection)
 Nazareth, (wood engraving), 1856
 Eastern Woman, 1856
 Eyes to the Blind, 1861
 After the Spanish, c. 1861
 Blind Bartemeus, 1865
 Nearing Home, 1866
 The Holy Family, 1866
 Interior, Algiers, 1867
 The Favourite, date unknown

See also

 List of Orientalist artists
 List of artistic works with Orientalist influences
 Orientalism

References 

1823 births
1909 deaths
19th-century English painters
Artists' Rifles soldiers
Date of birth unknown
Date of death unknown
English male painters
Orientalist painters
Painters from London
Place of death missing
Pre-Raphaelite painters
19th-century English male artists